The siege of Santo Domingo (1808) was the second and final major battle of the Spanish reconquest of Santo Domingo and was fought between November 7, 1808 and July 11, 1809 at Santo Domingo, Captaincy General of Santo Domingo. A force of Dominican and Puerto Rican of 1,850 troops led by Gen. Juan Sánchez Ramírez, with a naval blockaded by British Commander Hugh Lyle Carmichael, besieged and captured the city of Santo Domingo after an 8 months garrisoning of 2,000 troops of the French Army led by General Dubarquier.

Background
Upon hearing the news of Napoleon's invasion of Spain in 1808, Juan Sánchez Ramírez launched a war against the French troops who were nominally controlling the island. After some initial defeats, the loyalists managed a key victory in November, in the Battle of Palo Hincado, where Sánchez Ramírez's 2,000 soldiers overwhelmed Gen. Louis Ferrand's 600. There, with his numbers diminished owing to the desertion of Dominicans, the French commander faced certain defeat.

Ferrand's pride was so wounded that he killed himself after the defeat. This would not stop the French, however, and General Dubarquier took over the fight. He resorted to enlisting Dominican slaves to fight against Sánchez Ramírez. Only with the help of the British Jamaicans could the loyalists expel the French, an event that would finally come to pass in 1809, the year in which British gunships fired into Santo Domingo, prompting Barquier to surrender the island.

See also
 Siege of Santo Domingo (1805)

References

Delafosse, Lemonier; "Second Campaign of Santo Domingo — Dominican-French War of 1808" (translation of C. Armando Rodriguez); Editorial El Diario, Santiago (DR); 1946.
Guillermin, Gilbert; "Journal History of the Spanish revolution of Santo Domingo" (translation C. Armando Rodriguez); Dominican Academy of History; Imp editing PV Lafourcade, Philadelphia, U.S.; 1810. 
Sánchez Ramírez, Juan; "Journal of the Reconquista"; Editor Montalvo, Santo Domingo (R.D.); 1957.

Military history of the Dominican Republic
History of Santo Domingo
History of the Dominican Republic